Veľký Meder (1948–1990 Čalovo) is a town in the Dunajská Streda District, Trnava Region in southwestern Slovakia.

Etymology
The name is derived from the name of the ancient Hungarian Megyer tribe.

Geography
Veľký Meder lies in the eastern part of Great Rye Island, on the western border of historical Komárom County, 
around 20 km southeast of Dunajská Streda and 35 km northwest of Komárno. Administratively, the town belongs to the Trnava Region, Dunajská Streda District.
The town is renowned for its thermal spring.

History
In the 9th century, the territory of Veľký Meder became part of the Kingdom of Hungary.
The first written record about Veľký Meder was in 1248 under name Villa Meger. 
The population of the town has been predominantly Hungarian at least since the Middle Ages.
In the Middle and Modern Ages, the settlement was a little market town in the western part of Komárom county. In 1466, Hungarian king Matthias Corvinus gave the town privileges.
During the period of 1914-18 (World war I), near the town's railway station, was the location of the Austro-Hungarian death camp Kriegsgefangenenlager Nagymegyer. The Serbian cemetery in Veľký Meder has mass graves and monument to 5,153 Serb and Montenegrin war prisoners who died in the Kriegsgefangenenlager Nagymegyer, Austro-Hungarian POW camp. 
After the Austro-Hungarian army disintegrated in November 1918, Czechoslovak troops occupied the area, later acknowledged internationally by the Treaty of Trianon. Between 1938 and 1945 Veľký Meder once more became part of Miklós Horthy's Hungary through the First Vienna Award. From 1945 until the Velvet Divorce, it was part of Czechoslovakia. Since then it has been part of Slovakia.

Ethnic groups
According to the 2001 census, the most dominant group in the town are the Hungarians (84.6%), next are the Slovaks (13.5%), and there are small minorities of Czechs and Romani (both 0.7%).

Twin towns — sister cities

Veľký Meder is twinned with:

 Čačak, Serbia
 Dębica, Poland
 Dobruška, Czech Republic
 Bácsalmás, Hungary
 Kapuvár, Hungary
 Tápiógyörgye, Hungary

References

External links
 Town website
 Nagymegyer, Hungary (now Vel'ký Meder, Slovakia) ShtetLink (JewishGen.org)
 Spectacular Slovakia travelguide - Veľký Meder: From under the ground

Cities and towns in Slovakia
Hungarian communities in Slovakia